Bynoe is a surname. Notable people with the surname include:

Benjamin Bynoe (1804–1865), naval surgeon on HMS Beagle with Charles Darwin
Hilda Bynoe (1921–2013), Governor of Grenada
Peter Bynoe (born 1951), American lawyer and businessman
Philip Bynoe, American musician
Robin Bynoe (born 1941), West Indian cricketer from Barbados

See also
Acacia bynoeana, known colloquially as Bynoe's wattle, a species of Acacia native to eastern Australia
Heteronotia binoei, commonly known as Bynoe's gecko, a species of lizard endemic to Australia
Bynoe, Northern Territory, a locality